The 2011 Vuelta a Asturias was the 55th edition of the Vuelta a Asturias road cycling stage race, which was held from 28 April to 2 May 2011. The race started in Oviedo and finished at Alto del Naranco. The race was won by Javier Moreno of the  team.

General classification

References

Vuelta Asturias
2011 in road cycling
2011 in Spanish sport